Clair Barth Johnson (January 3, 1950 – April 22, 2020) was an American professional baseball player, a right-handed pitcher who played in the Major Leagues between – for the Chicago White Sox.

From 1980 to 1997, Johnson was a scout for the White Sox.

Johnson lived in Oak Lawn, Illinois. He died on April 22, 2020 in Palos Heights, Illinois from complications of Parkinson's disease.

References

External links

Mexican League statistics
Bart Johnson at (Venezuelan Professional Baseball League)

1950 births
2020 deaths
Águilas del Zulia players
Alijadores de Tampico players
American expatriate baseball players in Canada
American expatriate baseball players in Mexico
Appleton Foxes players
Baseball players from Torrance, California
Chicago White Sox players
Chicago White Sox scouts
Florida Instructional League White Sox players
Iowa Oaks players
Knoxville Sox players
Major League Baseball pitchers
Mexican League baseball pitchers
Osos Negros de Toluca players
Parade High School All-Americans (boys' basketball)
Tampa Bay Devil Rays scouts
Tucson Toros players
Vancouver Canadians players
Neurological disease deaths in Illinois
Deaths from Parkinson's disease